Gozbert may refer to:

 Gozbert (Saint Gall) (816-837), Abbot of the monastery of St. Gall
 Gozbert, the father of Hedan II